Cry Chicago (originally ¡Viva América! and also released as The Mafia Mob) is a 1969 Spanish-Italian crime film directed by the Catalan film director Javier Setó (in the credit Saviero Seto), starring Jeffrey Hunter, Guglielmo Spoletini, Eduardo Fajardo, Víctor Israel, Pier Angeli, Margaret Lee and Gogó Rojo.

Plot 
After the Great Depression Francesco Mannata started out to America from Sicily to his brother Salvatore in Chicago. Francesco takes the name Frank Mannata and with Salvatore and their sister, Rosella organized a mafia empire. The mafia war breaks out between the Sicilian Mannatas and the Italo-Irish O'Connor-Messina gangs. Many people die in the conflicts (including Salvatore and Rose); finally, Frank Mannata is killed by the minor gangster Dr. MacDonald.

Cast 
 Jeffrey Hunter: Frank (Francesco) Mannata
 Guglielmo Spoletini: Salvatore Mannata, Frank's brother
 Margaret Lee: Lucy Barrett, Frank's wife
 Gogó Rojo: Rosella (Rose) Mannata, Frank's sister
 Pier Angeli: Bambi (as Anna Maria Pierangeli), Salvatore's lover
 Eduardo Fajardo: Dick O'Connor, Irish gangster boos
 Víctor Israel: Dr. MacDonald, doctor, consultant and gangster
 Beni Deus: Timothy, Rosella's Greek husband
 Paloma Cela
 Luis Induni: Buchanan, police chief of Chicago
 Sun De Sanders: Patricia
 Barta Barri: Matón, O'Connor's henchman
 Antonio Pica: Federel agent Ethen Lason
 Ricardo Palacios: Charlie Romero, bar owner
 Lola Villar: prostituta
 Mike Brendel
 Miguel del Castillo: O'Brian, gangster and O'Connor's mate
 Juan Olaguivel: O'Brian's bodyguard and driver
 Fernando Bilbao
 Kathy Lagarde
 Yamil Omar: Turkish immigrant
 Antonia Mas: Mammy, proprietress of bordello
 Rafael Vaquero
 Adolfo Thous
 Manuel Bermúdez Boliche
 José Solís
 Armando Calvo: Senator Charles Temple

Production 
Setó's movie partly is the epigon of crime film They Paid with Bullets: Chicago 1929 (1969) of Julio Diamante.

While in Spain in November 1968 to film Cry Chicago, Jeffrey Hunter was injured in an on-set explosion when a car window near him, which had been rigged to explode outward, accidentally exploded inward.  Hunter sustained a serious concussion. According to Hunter's wife Emily, he "...went into shock" on the plane ride back to the United States after filming.  After landing, Hunter was taken to Good Samaritan Hospital in Los Angeles but doctors could not find any serious injuries.  On May 26, 1969, Hunter suffered an intracranial hemorrhage in Van Nuys, California. He fell and struck his head on a banister, fracturing his skull.  He was found unconscious and taken to Valley Presbyterian Hospital where he underwent brain surgery to repair his injuries.  He died the following morning at the age of 42. This was Hunter's final completed film role.

References

External links 
 

Spanish crime films
Italian crime films
1969 films
Films directed by Javier Setó
Films scored by Gianfranco Reverberi
1969 crime films
Films about the Chicago Outfit
1960s Italian films